Mishaal bin Abdullah Al Saud is a member of the House of Saud who served as the governor of the Northern Borders Region between 2015 and 2017. He was appointed governor following the death of his father, Abdullah bin Abdulaziz Al Saud. Before that Prince Mishaal served as an advisor of King Salman.

Biography
Prince Mishaal was born in Arar, and studied there until receiving a general certificate of secondary school. Then he earned a bachelor's degree in industrial management, and a master's degree in business administration International, and a master's in political science from the University of Denver, and a doctorate in international relations from the same university. After graduation, he worked along with Prince Sultan bin Abdulaziz Al Saud, as head of the Office of the Information Centre. He served as an advisor at the rank of minister for Salman bin Abdulaziz Al Saud when he was crown prince and then king. 

Prince Mishaal's term as the governor of the Northern Borders Region ended on 23 April 2017 when Faisal bin Khalid Al Saud was appointed to the post.

Prince Mishaal is the recipient of different medals, including the Order of Merit in 2008, and order of Kuwait Liberation Medal 1991.

References

Mishaal
Mishaal
Living people
University of Denver alumni
Mishaal
Year of birth missing (living people)